The Dean of Ontario is an Anglican dean in the Anglican Diocese of Ontario of the Ecclesiastical Province of Ontario, based at St George's Cathedral, Kingston. The incumbent is also Rector of St George's.
The incumbents have been :

References

Deans of Ontario